Long Lehao (born 4 July 1938) is a Chinese aerospace engineer and scientist who was the chief designer of Long March expendable launch system rockets and deputy chief designer of the Chinese Lunar Exploration Program.

Biography
Long was born into a family of farming background in Hanyang County (now Wuhan), Hubei, on 4 July 1938. In September 1958, he was accepted to Shanghai Jiao Tong University, where he majored in automatic control. After graduating in July 1963, he was dispatched to the Unit 742 of the People's Liberation Army. He was transferred to the 1st Department of 1st Institute of 7th Ministry of Machinery Industry,  which was reshuffled as the Ministry of Aerospace Industry in May 1982. In August 1986, he became deputy chief designer of Long March 3A orbital carrier rocket, rising to chief designer in December 1989. He was vice president of China Academy of Launch Vehicle Technology in November 1993, and held that office until January 2000. In March 2004, he was made deputy chief designer of the Chinese Lunar Exploration Program, and served until April 2009. On 12 December 2019, he was hired as the honorary president of Shangqiu Institute of Technology.

Honours and awards
 2001 Member of the Chinese Academy of Engineering (CAE)

References

External links
Biography of Long Lehao on Ho Leung Ho Lee Foundation

1938 births
Living people
People from Wuhan
Engineers from Hubei
Shanghai Jiao Tong University alumni
Members of the Chinese Academy of Engineering